Animesh Aich (born 8 February) is a Bangladeshi film maker, actor, director and writer. He won the Bangladesh National Film Award for Best Art Direction for the film Guerrilla (2011). As of 2019, he directed three films and several television dramas.

Education
Aich studied sculpting at Faculty of Fine Arts, University of Dhaka.

Career
Aich joined an advertising company as a copy writer. Aich and some other contemporary directors such as Mostofa Sarwar Farooki, Tarek Shahriar, Nurul Alam Atique were involved with Jolchobi. Later he joined as an associate director in Cycle er Dana. He debuted in directing through a television drama named Kufa in 2002. In 2004, he directed another television drama, Chor Eshe Bhul Korechilo.

Aich directed Guerrilla (2011), Zero Degree (2015) and Voyonkor Sundor (2017).

Awards
 Meril-Prothom Alo Best Director Award for Drama (2004)

Works

Film
 Lalon (2004)
 Guerrilla (2011)
 Runaway (2013)
 Zero Degree (2015)
 Voyonkor Sundor (2017)

Telefilm
 Chorer Master (2021)

Web series
 Beauty and the Bullet (2019)

References

External links
 

Living people
University of Dhaka Faculty of Fine Arts alumni
Bangladeshi filmmakers
Bangladeshi film directors
Year of birth missing (living people)
Place of birth missing (living people)